Arthur Barnett may refer to:
Arthur Barnett Ltd, a New Zealand department store (also erroneously known as Arthur Barnett's)
 Arthur Barnett building, the former flagship store building for the chain in Dunedin, since demolished and replaced by the Meridian Mall
Arthur Barnett (businessman) (1873–1959), founder of the former chain
A. Doak Barnett (1921–1999), American journalist and political scientist

See also
 Arthur B. Spingarn (Arthur Barnette Spingarn, 1878–1971), American civil rights leader